Patrick Loubert (born 1947 in Toronto, Ontario) is one of the founders of the Canadian animation studio, Nelvana Limited, along with Clive A. Smith and Michael Hirsh. He has produced, and executive-produced, much of the company's most memorable fare.

At the beginning of his career, Loubert published The Great Canadian Comic Books, a 1971 book focusing on the early days of local comic lore, with partner Hirsh. With Don Haig, he scripted and directed 125 Rooms of Comfort, another live-action project, in 1974. He also produced the first season of Inspector Gadget for DIC Entertainment with show's creator Jean Chalopin (The first season was animated and co-produced by Nelvana), Gargoyles: The Goliath Chronicles for Disney and Buena Vista, the adventure game Toonstruck and the American thriller film Malice (starring Alec Baldwin, Nicole Kidman and Bill Pullman) and worked as a storyboard artist and story writer for Nelvana's first feature-length film Rock and Rule and executive story editor for the third Care Bears feature film The Care Bears Adventure in Wonderland. He also created the live-action TV series for Nelvana The Edison Twins and T. and T. (starring Mr. T) with Michael Hirsh and wrote scripts for the company's first two animated specials A Cosmic Christmas and The Devil and Daniel Mouse as well as writing the scripts for Babar: The Movie.

Loubert and his colleagues won an Emmy Award in 1990 (in the category Outstanding Animated Program) for the children's television series Beetlejuice.

References

External links

1947 births
Living people
Artists from Toronto
Film producers from Ontario
Canadian storyboard artists
Canadian television producers
Film directors from Toronto
Writers from Toronto
Canadian male screenwriters
20th-century Canadian screenwriters